Il seme dell'uomo (The Seed of Man) is a 1969 French-Italian film directed by Marco Ferreri. A young couple argue about having a child in the days after a global plague wipes out most of Earth's population.

References

External links

1969 films
French fantasy drama films
Italian fantasy drama films
Films directed by Marco Ferreri
1960s Italian-language films
1960s Italian films
1960s French films